Janusz Roman Maksymiuk (born 19 January 1947 in Janówka) is a Polish politician. He was elected to the Sejm on 25 September 2005, getting 7,384 votes in 22 Krosno district as a candidate from the Samoobrona Rzeczpospolitej Polskiej list.

He was also a member of Sejm 1991-1993 and Sejm 1993-1997.

See also
Members of Polish Sejm 2005-2007

External links
Janusz Maksymiuk - parliamentary page - includes declarations of interest, voting record, and transcripts of speeches.

Members of the Polish Sejm 2005–2007
Members of the Polish Sejm 1991–1993
Members of the Polish Sejm 1993–1997
1947 births
Living people
Polish United Workers' Party members
Democratic Left Alliance politicians
Self-Defence of the Republic of Poland politicians